Natalie Panek is a Canadian working in aerospace engineering. She works in the robotics and automation division of the space technology company MDA.

Education 
Panek grew up in Calgary, Alberta, where she was the only girl in her high school physics class. She competed in the North American Solar Challenge in 2005. Panek completed a bachelor's degree in Mechanical Engineering at the University of Calgary in 2007. She earned a masters in Aerospace Engineering at the University of Toronto in 2009. In Summer 2008, she worked at Goddard Space Flight Center.

Career 
After graduating, Panek attended the International Space University at Ames Research Center. Panek works at the space technology company MDA where she works on Canadian space exploration and robotics. She has been described as the Roberta Bondar of her generation. She is on the engineering team building the chassis and locomotion systems for European Space Agency's Rosalind Franklin Mars rover.

Public engagement and diversity 
Canada’s Financial Post describes Panek as “a vocal advocate for women in technology”. She regularly gives interviews about her career and campaigns for more women in science. In 2012 she delivered a TEDx Youth talk, Revolutionising Female Empowerment. In 2015 she delivered a TEDx talk in Toronto, Space, Our Invisible Landfill, which has been viewed over one million times.

Panek was a presenter at the Ontario Science Centre RBC Innovator's Ball in 2016. She appeared on an episode of CBC Television's The Next 150, Our Canada needs more everyday explorers. She is a speaker with the National Speakers Bureau. She spoke at the 2016 Women of Influence and 2017 Girl Talk Empowerment conferences.

She was part of the "#Canada150Women" campaign by author Paulina Cameron. She is a cybermentor with the University of Calgary's online program.

Alongside her work and advocacy, Panek enjoys backpacking. She is a champion of Trans Canada Trail.

Awards and honours 
2013 - University of Calgary Graduate of the Last Decade Award 

2013 -  Northern Lights Aero Foundation Rising Star

2013 - CBC’s 12 young leaders changing Canada

2014 - WXN's Top 100 Award Winner

2015 - Forbes 30 under 30

2015 - Flare magazine's 30 under 30

2016 - Wings Magazine Top 20 under 40

2016 - Canada's Greatest Women Explorers Canadian Geographic

2018 - Inspiring Fifty Canada

References

External links 
 
 

1983 births
Living people
Science communicators
Canadian Internet celebrities
People from Calgary
University of Calgary alumni
University of Toronto alumni
21st-century women engineers